Sir George Thomas Staunton, 2nd Baronet (26 May 1781 – 10 August 1859) was an English traveller and Orientalist.

Early life

Born at Milford House near Salisbury, he was the son of Sir George Leonard Staunton (1737–1801), first baronet, diplomatist and Orientalist. In 1792, at the age of 12, he accompanied his father, who had been appointed secretary to Lord Macartney's mission to China, to the Far East (1792–1794). Prior to the trip the young George Staunton had begun to learn Chinese alongside Sir John Barrow, 1st Baronet and for the duration was therefore given the role of Page to Lord Macartney.  During the mission his Chinese proved good enough to engage in diplomatic banter and he received a personal gift from the Qianlong Emperor. In 1797 he spent two terms at Trinity College, Cambridge.

In the employ of the East India Company
In 1798 was appointed a writer in the British East India Company's factory at Canton (Guangzhou), and subsequently its chief. During this time his knowledge of Chinese increased.  In 1805 he translated a work of Dr George Pearson into Chinese. Five years later, he published an English translation of a significant part of the Chinese legal code.

In 1801 he succeeded his father to the baronetcy and in April 1803 was elected a Fellow of the Royal Society.

Many people came to ask for help in both learning the Chinese dialect there and staying, including Robert Morrison and Thomas Manning.

In 1816 Staunton proceeded as second commissioner on a special mission to Beijing with Lord Amherst and Sir Henry Ellis. During the mission he landed in Hong Kong in July, 1816.  He walked from the shore of Hong Kong to Hong Kong Village via Wong Chuk Hang.  After the trip, Wong Chuk Hang was named Staunton Creek and the valley where Hong Kong Village was located was named Staunton Valley. Staunton Creek later became a cesspool of mud and rotting sampans and was eventually cleared to create Wong Chuk Hang Nullah with the residents housed in Wong Chuk Hang Estate. Hong Kong Village was most likely Wong Chuk Hang Lo Wai; only Wong Chuk Hang San Wai still exists at the bottom of Shouson Hill. After the ceding of Hong Kong from China to Great Britain, Staunton Street in Central was named after him.

The embassy was unsuccessful and shortly after it departed back to Britain Staunton decided to leave China permanently.

Back in Britain

George Staunton had been looking for a country home for some years before his permanent return from China and in 1818 put in a bid for Newstead Abbey but was outbid by Thomas Wildman. In 1820 he purchased the Leigh estate in Hampshire which included what was to become Staunton Country Park. He lived there for part of each year and made substantial alterations to the buildings and the landscape.

Three years later he was heavily involved with the founding of the Royal Asiatic Society of Great Britain and Ireland. Their Sir George Staunton prize is awarded annually.

Between 1818 and 1852 he was MP for several English constituencies, finally for Portsmouth. He latterly described himself as being during his early years in parliament a liberal Tory who looked to George Canning for leadership.   He was a member of the East India Committee, and in 1823, in conjunction with Henry Thomas Colebrooke founded the Royal Asiatic Society.

From 1829 until 1856 he was a member of the Society of Dilettanti

He had never married and the baronetcy became extinct on his death (in London). He left his Irish estate, Clydagh House, to his eldest cousin George Staunton Lynch (who took the additional surname of Staunton) and Leigh Park and his London house (17, Devonshire Street, Marylebone) to George Staunton Lynch's younger brother, Captain Henry Cormick Lynch.

Publications
His publications include translations of Great Qing Legal Code, known as the Fundamental Laws of China (1810) and of the Narrative of the Chinese Embassy to the Khan of the Tourgouth Tartars (1821); Miscellaneous Notices Relating to China and our Commercial Intercourse with that Country (1822); Notes of Proceedings and Occurrences during the British Embassy to Peking (1824); Observations on our Chinese Commerce (1850). For the Hakluyt Society he edited Juan González de Mendoza's History of the Great and Mighty Kingdom of China.

References

External links
 
 
 

1781 births
1859 deaths
Alumni of Trinity College, Cambridge
Baronets in the Baronetage of Ireland
English orientalists
Members of the Parliament of the United Kingdom for English constituencies
Members of the Parliament of the United Kingdom for constituencies in Cornwall
People from Salisbury
UK MPs 1818–1820
UK MPs 1830–1831
UK MPs 1820–1826
UK MPs 1831–1832
UK MPs 1832–1835
UK MPs 1837–1841
UK MPs 1841–1847
UK MPs 1847–1852
Fellows of the Royal Society
Committee members of the Society for the Diffusion of Useful Knowledge